A gallows is a frame, typically wooden, used for execution by hanging.

Gallows may also refer to:

Music
Gallows (band), a hardcore punk band from Watford, England
Gallows (album), a 2012 album by Gallows
"Gallows", a song by Atreyu from the album Congregation of the Damned
"Gallows", a song by Scale the Summit from the album The Collective

People
Luke Gallows, the wrestling stage persona of Andrew William Hankinson

Fictional characters
Gallows (G.I. Joe), a G.I. Joe character
Judge Gallows, a fictional character in the fantasy-horror comics anthology series The Unexpected

Places
Gallows Bay (disambiguation)
Gallows Corner, London
Gallows Hill (disambiguation)
Gallows Island, Bermuda
Gallows Point, Antarctica
Gallows Pond, Massachusetts

Other
The Gallows, a 2015 pseudo-documentary found footage film
The Gallows Act II, the 2019 sequel to the 2015 film

See also